Blithbury is a small village in Lichfield District, Staffordshire, England.

The public house bears the name The Bull and Spectacles. In the 19th century it had the more common name of Bulls Head.

In the first half of the 12th century religious houses for monks and nuns were founded at Blithbury. Within a few decades only the nuns are mentioned. The order was associated with the nuns of Black Ladies Priory, Brewood, and was eventually absorbed by them, so that there is no mention of the nuns of Blithbury after the early 14th century.

According to Douglas Adams' 1983 humorous dictionary "The Meaning of Liff", a Blithbury is "A look someone gives you by which you become aware that they're much too drunk to have understood anything you've said to them in the last twenty minutes".

References

External links

Villages in Staffordshire
Lichfield District